The 1922 Leicester East by-election was held on 30 March 1922.  The by-election was held due to the appointment as Lord Chief Justice of England and Wales of the incumbent Coalition Liberal MP, Gordon Hewart.  It was won by the Labour candidate George Banton.

Candidates
The Labour Party selected Leicester Council Alderman George Banton as their candidate. 
Leicester Council Alderman and former Mayor, Sir Jonathan North was approached to be the Coalition Liberal candidate. However, Albert E. Marlow, President of the Federation of Boot and Shoe Manufacturers ended up as the Coalition Liberal candidate. The Liberal Party approached Alderman Wakerley to be their candidate. Arnold Lupton a former Lincolnshire MP was an advocate of Liberal re-union and offered to stand as a compromise candidate. The Liberals ultimately selected St Albans City Councillor Wilberforce Allen.

Result

References

1922 elections in the United Kingdom
1922 in England
1920s in Leicestershire
March 1922 events
Elections in Leicester
By-elections to the Parliament of the United Kingdom in Leicestershire constituencies
Ministerial by-elections to the Parliament of the United Kingdom
20th century in Leicester